The Wilding is a 2012 Australian gay drama film written and directed by Grant Scicluna and funded through Springboard, an initiative of Screen Australia. The film stars Reef Ireland, Shannon Glowacki, Luke Mullins and Frank Sweet and had its world premiere in competition at the Berlin International Film Festival on 9 February 2012 and was nominated for the Teddy Award.

The film competed at number of film festivals including Sydney Film Festival, Show Me Shorts, Melbourne Queer Film Festival, Palm Springs International Film Festival and St Kilda Film Festival and earned good reviews before winning the prestigious Iris Prize in 2012.

Premise 
Malcolm, a hardened borstal inmate, is in love with his cellmate Tye. As Malcolm faces an opportunity for parole, a feud with other inmates escalates, with Tye being targeted as Malcolm's weak spot. Malcolm is forced to choose between his own freedom and protecting the one he loves.

Cast
Reef Ireland as Malcolm
Luke Mullins as Adam
Frank Sweet as Gavin
Shannon Glowacki as Tye
Richard Anastasios as Simmo
Lachlan Ward as Bosey

Reception

Critical response
The film received mainly positive reviews with Adrian Naik of big gay picture show praising Scicluna's direction and said "This is raw Australian filmmaking at its best. Combining the visceral brutality of Romper Stomper and the gritty terror of Chopper, The Wilding holds its own against films of this caliber, while still shocking those numb to their effects."

Accolades

Filming locations
The film was shot in Sunbury in Australia and its surrounding suburbs.

Feature film
In 2014 Screen Australia and Film Victoria announced investment in a feature film based on the short film, titled Downriver and will feature Ireland in the lead role.

See also
 Cinema of Australia

References

External links 
 

2012 films
Australian drama short films
Films set in Australia
2012 short films
Australian LGBT-related films
Films shot in Australia
Australian independent films
LGBT-related short films
2012 LGBT-related films
LGBT-related drama films
2010s English-language films